Franklin the Turtle may refer to:

Franklin the Turtle (books), a series of children's books by Paulette Bourgeois
Franklin (TV series), a Canadian cel-animated series, based on the books
Franklin and Friends, a Canadian CGI-animated series that began in 2011